Nutan Marathi Vidyalaya (NMV)  is one of the oldest schools in Pune, Maharashtra, India. The school was founded by the Shikshan Prasarak Mandali, an educational charity on 1 January 1883. The school has a secondary school section for students in grade five to ten and a junior college for students in grade eleven and twelve.

Notable faculty

 Sonopant (Shankar Vaman) Dandekar (1896–1969), philosopher and educationalist.
 Prahlad Narhar Joshi (1924-), writer and former headteacher of the school.
 Shripad Mahadev Mate (1886–1957), writer and former teacher.
 Datto Vaman Potdar (1890–1979), historian.
 Vinayak Kulkarni, Marathi writer and researcher on Marathi Saint Literature
 Chandrashekhar Agashe (1888–1956), founder of Brihan Maharashtra Sugar Syndicate

Notable alumni
 Chintaman Vinayak Joshi (1892–1963), Marathi humorist and a researcher in Pali literature.
 Sane Guruji (24 Dec 1899 – 11 June 1950) - Indian freedom fighter, social reformer, teacher, author and poet in Marathi literature
 Yeshwant Vishnu Chandrachud (1920–2008), longest-serving Chief Justice of India.
 Dr. Mohan Agashe (1947-) - actor on Marathi stage and in Films. Psychiatrist.
 Chandrashekhar Agashe (1888–1956), founder of Brihan Maharashtra Sugar Syndicate
 Harshad Khadiwale
 Ashwin Chitale actor.
 Subodh Bhave, a renowned  Marathi film actor and director.
Jasraj Jayant Joshi - Marathi singer
Sanjeev Abhyankar Hindustani Classical Singer Mewati Gharana, 
Anand Bhate - Marathi Singer in Hindustani Classical Music, and Marathi Natyasangeet
Shivrampant Damle (1900–1977), Indian educationist

See also 
List of schools in Pune

References

High schools and secondary schools in Maharashtra
Educational institutions established in 1883
Schools in Pune
1883 establishments in India
Schools in Colonial India